The 1906–07 Colgate Raiders men's basketball team represented Colgate University during the 1906–07 college men's basketball season. The head coach was Ellery Huntington Sr. coaching the Raiders in his seventh season. The team had finished with an overall record of 9–5.

Schedule

|-

References

Colgate Raiders men's basketball seasons
Colgate
Colgate
Colgate